Presidential Campaign is a board game published in 1979 by Banovac Corporation.

Contents
Presidential Campaign is a game in which players move by rolling dice, and can collect cards, and are able wage contests against opponents to get more cards by using dice rolls.

Reception
Alan R. Moon reviewed Presidential Campaign for Games International magazine and stated that "it is nothing but a piece of junk [...] If I wasn't a collector, I'd burn it."

References

Board games introduced in 1979